Neuropixels probes are electrodes developed in 2017 to record the activity of hundreds of neurons in the brain. The probes are based on CMOS technology and have 1,000 recording sites arranged in two rows on a thin, 1-cm long shank.

The probes are used in hundreds of neuroscience laboratories including the International Brain Laboratory, to record brain activity mostly in mice and rats. By revealing the activity of vast numbers of neurons, Neuropixels probes are allowing new approaches to the study of brain processes such as sensory processing, decision making, internal state, and emotions and to create brain-machine interfaces.

The probes were announced in 2017. They are designed and fabricated by imec, an electronics research center in Belgium. In 2022, Neuropixels probes were inserted in human patients.

References

External links 
 UCL Neuropixels page
 neuropixels.org

Neuroscience
Neural engineering